Dual naming is the adoption of an official place name that combines two earlier names, or uses both names, often to resolve a disagreement over which of the two individual names is more appropriate. In some cases, the reasons are political. Sometimes the two individual names are from different languages; in some cases this is because the country has more than one official language, and in others, one language has displaced another.

In several countries, dual naming has begun to be applied only recently. This has come about in places where a colonial settler community had displaced the indigenous peoples and started using names in the settler language centuries ago, and more recent efforts have been made to use names in the indigenous language alongside the colonial names, as an act of reconciliation.

Australia 
In Australia, a dual naming policy is often now used officially to name landmarks that are of significance to local Indigenous Australians, but for which the most common name is European.  For example, the landmark with the Pitjantjatjara name Uluru and English name Ayers Rock is now officially named Uluru / Ayers Rock.

In the city of Adelaide, the Adelaide City Council began the process of dual naming all of the city squares, each of the parks making up the parklands which surround the Adelaide city centre and North Adelaide, and other sites of significance to the Kaurna people (the "Adelaide tribe") in 1997. The naming process, which assigned an extra name in the Kaurna language to each place, was mostly completed in 2003, and the renaming of 39 sites finalised and endorsed by the council in 2012.

The Cocos (Keeling) Islands had their official dual name attested from 1916, and was made official by the Cocos (Keeling) Islands Act 1955.

Finland 
In Finland, many towns have two names, one in Finnish and one in Swedish (the two official languages of the country). The two names are considered equally correct but are not used as a formal duality of names.

France and Switzerland 
The official names of bilingual areas of Alsace, France, and Switzerland also apply. For instance, the German and French Swiss town of Biel/Bienne is the combination of its German name (Biel) and its French name (Bienne).

New Zealand 
Similarly, some places in New Zealand have dual Māori and English names, such as Aoraki / Mount Cook. The practice of officially giving certain New Zealand places dual names began in the 1920s, but dual names have become much more common in the 1990s and 2000s, in part due to Treaty of Waitangi settlements.

Northern Ireland 
"Derry/Londonderry" has been used unofficially to circumvent the Derry/Londonderry name dispute, in which Irish nationalists used "Derry" and Ulster unionists use "Londonderry" for the city and county in Northern Ireland. The "Derry stroke Londonderry" spoken form of this has in turn engendered the city's nickname "Stroke City".

Romania 
In Romania, the cities of Turnu Severin and Cluj were renamed Drobeta-Turnu Severin in 1972 and Cluj-Napoca in 1974, respectively, for political reasons, as the communist government wanted to emphasize the cities' Roman origins.

Spain 
Another example of the phenomenon can be seen in the name of the capital of the Spanish Basque Country, Vitoria-Gasteiz. This combines the city's Spanish name of Vitoria and Basque name of Gasteiz.

United States 
The Denali–Mount McKinley naming dispute is an example of a dual naming issue in the United States.

Border geographical features
A special problem occurs when the landmark lies on the border between two or more countries. For example, Mount Everest has several different names used locally.

See also
 Bilingual tautological names
 List of dual place names in New Zealand
 Names of places in Finland in Finnish and in Swedish

References

Alternative place names
Concepts in language policy
Naming controversies